Mimpi (meaning Dream) is a compilation album by Indonesian singer Anggun, features 2 hit singles "Mimpi" and "Bayang Bayang Ilusi". The album was released in 1989 under label Atlantic Records, Indonesia. The song "Mimpi" eventually got placed at number 47 on Rolling Stone Indonesia's "150 Greatest Indonesian Songs of All Time" list. Mimpi has sold approximately 1 million copies in Indonesia.

Album information
Anggun couldn't reach her big popularity actually when release her rock debut, Dunia Aku Punya in 1986. It needed a longer time to make her being a superstar. This was the album that brought Anggun's name into her big fame as a lady rocker in Indonesia. However, it is not her solo album, but a compilation album of Indonesian rockers such as Gito Rollies, Deddy Stanzah, and Euis Darliah. Anggun only sang 2 songs: "Mimpi" and "Bayang Bayang Ilusi". Both singles were written by Teddy Sudjaja and Pamungkas NM. The first single, "Mimpi" became a big hit in Indonesia at the time and then followed by the second single, "Bayang Bayang Ilusi". Due to the success of the album Anggun was also known as "single/compilation singer", that often released an album with a mere one/two singles on it.

Re-released
Sixteen years after the release of "Mimpi" and "Bayang Bayang Ilusi", Anggun re-released the songs along with "Takut" on her Best Of album in 2006 under label Sony BMG in Indonesia and Malaysia. The songs were re-recorded in the new version with arrangement by Andy Ayunir and orchestra group Saunine. "Mimpi" was chosen again as its lead single off the album and became a hit again for the second time.

Track listing
 "Mimpi" - Anggun
 "Bayang Bayang Ilusi" - Anggun
 "Siapa Aku" - Deddy Stanzah
 "Suara Hati" - Gito Rollies
 "Tatap Dunia" - Deddy Dores
 "Api Telah Padam" - Gito Rollies
 "Aku Melangkah" - Andry Kasman
 "Citraku" - Euis Darliah
 "Sungguh Bosan" - Andry Kasman
 "Negosiasi" - Deddy Stanzah

References

External links
 Anggun's Mimpi Description

Anggun albums
1990 compilation albums